Takaidi (also Romanized as Tākā’īdī and Tākā’edī) is a village in Tashan-e Sharqi Rural District, Tashan District, Behbahan County, Khuzestan Province, Iran. At the 2006 census, its population was 344, in 61 families.

References 

Populated places in Behbahan County